Rajamundry Sarkar was one of the five Northern Circars in the Golconda Sultanate, Deccan Subah of Mughal empire and later in the Nizam's dominion of Hyderabad. During Qutb Shahi, Mughal and Nizam rule it was referred in official records with name Rājmandrī and the same name was anglicized in the British colonial era as Rajahmundry or Rajamundry. The Northern Circars were the most prominent ones in the Subah of Deccan. The Northern Circars were five in number: Chicacole (Srikakulam), Rajmandri (Rajahmundry), Ellore (Eluru), Mustaphanagar (Kondapalli) and Murtuzanagar (Guntur). A Circar was an English spelling of sarkar, a Mughal term for a district (a subdivision of a subah or province), which had been in use since the time of Sher Shah Suri (1486–1545). A sarkar was further divided into Mahals  or Parganas. The Hills in the Eastern Ghats near Pentakota village were considered the northern limit of the Rajahmundry Circar beyond which was the Chicacole Circar. The southern limit was bounded by Ellor circar with the Godavari river demarcating the boundary.

Early history
During Vengi Chalukya era, Rajamundry was capital and later during Kakatiya rule it was a fort. Subsequently, during the Reddy kingdom rule, Rajamundry was first a sub-capital (Upa-Rājadhāni) and later became capital town. During the reign of Ghiyath al-Din Tughluq, after the fall of Kakatiyas, Rajamundry province fell to the invading armies of Ulugh Khan (later Muhammad ibn Tughluq) around 1324AD. In the same year, one of the oldest Mosques in Madras presidency was built here after destroying a Hindu temple by massacring the priests and the ruins of that temple were used to build the mosque now known as Royal mosque or Pedda Masiidu by natives. That mosque bears still an inscription that it was built by one of the commanders of Muhammad ibn Tughluq. Later a reconquest was launched by chieftains such as Prolaya Vema Nayaka, Prolaya Vema Reddi and liberated this province from Tughlaq rule.

Gajapati Era
Rajamundry was retroceded by Srikrishnadevaraya of Vijayanagara Empire to the Hindu rulers in Orissa, the Gajapatis as part of a peace treaty after his successful conquest of eastern provinces in 1512. After a martial alliance with Gajapatis, Krishandevaraya returned all the lands that the Vijayanagara Empire had captured north of the Krishna River; this made the Krishna river the boundary between the Vijayanagara empire and Gajapati Kingdom. During Gajapati era, Rajamundry was then organized as a danḍapāṭa with 21 sthalas (rough equivalent to Parganas).

The 21 Sthalas of Rajamundry Dandapata during Gajapati era were 1. Palnadu (Prolanadu or Pithapuram), 2. Bodasakurru, 3. Pannadu (Ponnāda), 4. Nandipudi, 5. Kimmuru (Peddapuram), 6. Bikkavolu, 7. Ithakota, 8. Konukonda (Korukonda), 9. Aratlakota, 10. Chodavaram, 11. Vinjavamam (Injaram), 12. Mrumalla (Muramalla), 13. Chagalnadu, 14. Molline, 15. Rajupudu, 16. Sarvasiddhi, 17. Rayavaram, 18. Kakinada, 19. Solapaka (Selapaka), 20. Tallapaka (Tatipaka), and 21. Kota. Each of these sthalas had a Sthala Karaṇam who maintained the accounts and held the title pātra.

Qutb Shahi Era
During Qutb Shahi era, Rajamundry Sarkar was existing and had 24 paraganas.

Mughal Era
The Mughals annexed Golconda sultanate during late seventeenth century in 1687 and organized it as Subah of Deccan. Rajamundry was one of the 22 Sarkars within that Subah. During the Mughal era there 17 parganas comprising 24 mahals. It can be noted that the terms Mahal and Pargana have been used interchangeably. However, there is an important difference between these two terms.

Information about the list of the parganas are available from Sawānih-i-Deccan, a Persian work compiled by Munīm Khan, a military commander during the era of Asaf Jah II.
The parganas of Rajamundry Sarkar are 1.Haveli Rajahmundry, 2.Arnalwarikonda, 3.Agarhar-o-sarwar, 4.Palawal (Palivela), 5.Borsakur, 6.Belhapur, 7.Chirlapalli, 8.Chankalinar (Chagalanadu), 9.Choddarham (Chodavaram), 10.Dudilodi, 11.Salwarikota Wokripalli, 12.Ainkota (Ithakota/Enugula Mahal), 13.Karkonda (Korukonda), 14.Kalibaradsowalbar, 15.Palwarikota, 16. Karmor (Peddapuram) and 17.Molair (Mulleru). During Mughal and Nizam rule the word Haveli implied capital or headquarters of a Sarkar.

Other resources to know about the administration divisions during the Mughal rule and early Nizam rule were Dastūr-al-amal-e-shāhanshāhi (1781) by Munshī Thākur Lāl, and Deh-be-dehi (c.1705) by Md. Shafīq.

British Era
The British assumed direct administration of the Northern Circars in 1769 which was later merged within the Madras Presidency. The British records mention that the Rajamundry Sarkar had 17 Parganas when they have acquired but many additional territorial dependencies were added either by conquest or policy. Also, they mention that very few of the original 17 can be traced during their time.

A partial list of parganas mentioned by English resident at Injeram during 1794 include Mandapeta, Nidadavolu, Biccavolu, Tuni, Vellakota, Changalnanda, Cadeam, Pithapuram, Itakota, Catrevukona, Moomidivaram, Peruru, Tatipaka, Peravaram, Vanapally, Achanta, Aravilly, Injaram and Narasapuram.

Later the British have reorganized this circar as Godavari district within the Madras Presidency. Rajahmundry town was made the headquarters of Godavari District and headquarters got shifted to Kakinada in 1859. An alphabetical list of villages and Taluks were prepared during British era for whole Madras presidency.

References

Notes

Subdivisions of the Mughal Empire